A Babson task (or simply Babson) is a  chess problem with the following properties:

White has only one , or first move, that forces checkmate in the stipulated number of moves.
Black's defences include the promotion of a certain pawn to a queen, rook, bishop, or knight. (Black may have other defences as well.)
If Black promotes, then White must promote a pawn to the same piece to which Black promoted in order to complete the solution.

, the task's eponym, first conceived of the task in 1884.
To devise a satisfying Babson task is regarded as one of the greatest challenges in chess composing. For almost a century, it was unknown whether such a task could exist.

The Babson task is a special form of Allumwandlung, a chess problem in which the solution contains promotions to each of the four possible pieces. Such problems were already known when Babson formulated his task.

Forerunners of the Babson task

This 1912 problem by Wolfgang Pauly is, as it were, a three-quarter Babson task: three of Black's promotions are matched by White.

The key is 1.b3, after which there are the following lines:

This is not a full Babson, however, because 1...a1=B 2.f8=B does not work; White must instead play 2.f8=Q, with similar play to above.

Selfmate Babsons
The earliest Babson tasks are all in the form of a selfmate, in which White, moving first, must force Black to deliver checkmate against Black's will within a specified number of moves. In 1914, Babson himself published such a problem, in which three different white pawns shared the promotions. 

Henry Wald Bettmann composed the first problem in which one black pawn and one white pawn were involved in all promotions, winning 1st prize in the Babson Task Tourney 1925–26.

The key in Bettmann's problem is 1.a8=B, after which play is as follows:

Various other composers later composed similar problems.

Directmate Babsons

Composing a Babson task in directmate form (where White moves first and must checkmate Black against any defence within a stipulated number of moves) was thought so difficult that very little effort was put into it until the 1960s, when Pierre Drumare began his work on the problem, which occupied him for the next twenty years or so. He managed to compose a Babson task in which the knight is replaced with the nightrider (a fairy chess piece which moves by making any number of knight moves in the same direction on unblocked squares) but found it hard to devise one using normal pieces: because of the knight's limited range, it is difficult to justify a knight promotion by White in response to a knight promotion by Black on the other side of the board.

When Drumare eventually succeeded using conventional pieces in 1980, the result was regarded as highly unsatisfactory, even by Drumare himself. It is a mate in five (first published Memorial Seneca, 1980). The key is 1.Rf2, after which captures by Black on b1 are answered by captures by White on g8.

Efficiency in chess problems is considered a great boon, but Drumare's attempt is very inefficient: no fewer than 30 pieces are on the board. It also has six promoted pieces in the initial position (even a single promoted piece is considered something of a "cheat" in chess problems), which is in any case illegal: one of the white f-pawns must have made a capture, and the white and black b- and c-pawns must have made two captures between them, making three in total, yet only two units are missing from the board. Despite all these flaws, it is the first complete Babson task.

In 1982, two years after composing this problem, Drumare gave up, saying that the Babson task would never be satisfactorily solved.

The following year, Leonid Yarosh, a football coach from Kazan who was virtually unknown as a problem composer until that point, came up with a much better Babson task than Drumare's: the position is legal; it is much simpler than Drumare's problem, and there are no promoted pieces on board. First published in March 1983 in the famous Russian chess magazine Shakhmaty v SSSR, this is generally thought of as the first satisfactory solution of the Babson task. Drumare himself had high praise for the problem.

The key is 1.Rxh4, and the main lines are:

However, Yarosh's problem has a small flaw: the key is a capture, something which is generally frowned upon in problems. Also, when first presented, the black piece at h4 was a pawn, but a computer discovered an additional solution by 1.axb8=N hxg3+ 2.Kh3 Bxb8 3.Qxc2 and mate next move. Yarosh then substituted a knight on that square; now 1.axb8=N fails to 1...Nf3+ 2.Bxf3 Bxb8 3.Qxc2 Bxg3+ and White is too late. Nevertheless, when Dutch author Tim Krabbé saw this version in the Soviet publication 64, he records that the realisation that somebody had at last solved the Babson task had the effect upon him as if he had  "... opened a newspaper and seen the headline 'Purpose Of Life Discovered'."

Yarosh continued to work on the problem, and in August 1983, he created an improved version with a non-capturing key, which appeared in Shakhmaty v SSSR. Many chess problemists, including Tim Krabbé, consider the problem one of the greatest ever composed. Again, it is a mate in four.

The key here is non-capturing and also thematic (that is, it is logically related to the rest of the solution): 1.a7. The variations are largely the same as in the original:

Yarosh composed a completely different Babson task later in 1983 and another in 1986. Several other Babsons were later composed by other authors, including one by Drumare in 1985. The solution of this Babson is 1.fxg8Q dxe2 2.Nxe3 e1Q/R/B/N 3.gxf8Q/R/B/N and now mate in two in all variations.

The cyclic Babson

In a cyclic Babson, rather than Black’s promotions being matched by White, they are related in cyclic form: for example, Black promoting to a queen means White must promote to a bishop, Black promoting to a bishop means White must promote to a rook, Black promoting to a rook means White must promote to a knight, and Black promoting to a knight means White must promote to a queen.

The August 2003 issue of the German problem magazine Die Schwalbe contained the problem to the right, a mate in four by Peter Hoffmann. Hoffmann had previously published a number of conventional directmate Babsons, but this one is significant because it is the first cyclic Babson. However, as with Drumare's original Babson task, the problem uses promoted pieces and has a capturing key.

The key is 1.Nxe6, threatening 2.hxg8=Q and 3.Qf7#. The thematic defences are:

1...d1=Q 2.hxg8=B (2.hxg8=Q? Qd7+ 3.Bxd7 stalemate; 2.hxg8=N+? Kxe6 and no mate), threatening 3.c4+ Q-moves 4.BxQ#
2...Qd7+ 3.Bxd7 Kxg6 4.Rxh6#
2...Qxc1 3.Rxg5 (threat: 4.Rf5#) hxg5 4.Qh8#
1...d1=B 2.hxg8=R (2.hxg8=Q? stalemate; 2.hxg8=N+? Kxe6 and no mate) Kxe6 3.Rd8 3.Kf6 Rd6#
1...d1=R 2.hxg8=N (2.hxg8=Q? Rd4+ 3.c4 stalemate) Kxe6 3.Qxe2+ K-moves 4.Qe5#
1...d1=N 2.hxg8=Q (2.hxg8=N+? Kxe6 3.Qxe2+ Ne3! and no mate) Nxb2+ 3.Kb5(Bxb2) and 4.Qf7#

There are also a number of sidelines.

Again, the composer was Peter Hoffmann.

The key is 1.Nxb6. The thematic defences are:

1...d1=Q 2.exf8=B (2.exf8=Q? Qd4+ 3.Bxd4 stalemate; 2.exf8=N+? Kd6 3.Be5+ Kc5 and no mate)
2...Qd4+ 3.exd4 Kxf6 4.d5#
1...d1=B 2.exf8=R (2.exf8=Q? stalemate; 2.exf8=N+? Kd6 3.Be5+ Kc5 and no mate)
2...Kd6 3.Qd2+ with mate after any move by black
1...d1=R 2.exf8=N+ (2.exf8=Q? Rd4+ 3.Bxd4 stalemate; 2.exf8=B? Rd7 3.c8=Q(B) stalemate)
2...Kd6 3.Be5+ Kc5 4.Qxc2#
1...d1=N 2.exf8=Q (2.exf8=N+? Kd6 3.Be5+ Kc5 and no mate)
2...Nxc3+ 3.Kxa5 Ne4 4.c8=Q#

References

Bibliography

Further reading
Jeremy Morse, Chess Problems Tasks and Records (Faber and Faber, 1995, revised edition 2001) – contains a chapter on the Babson task

External links

 (a detailed analysis of Yarosh's second Babson)
 (lists Babsons published later)
 (mentions two forerunners of the Babson task)

Chess problems